Iwona Chmielewska (born 1960) is a Polish author and illustrator, who publishes mainly for children but also for adults. Many of her works are published in South Korea where she has gained considerable popularity. She lives and works in Toruń in northern Poland where she teaches in the Faculty of Fine Arts at the Nicolaus Copernicus University.

Biography

Born on 5 February 1960 in Pabianice, Chmielewska studied graphic design at the Nicolaus Copernicus University in Toruń. She first published in South Korea in 1990 where she has now published over 20 books, many of which have been translated into other languages.

Chmielswska has received major awards including the Bologna Ragazzi from the Bologna Children's Book Fair (2011 and 2013) and the Golden Apple at the Biennial of Illustration in  Bratislava (2007).

Selected publications
 2005: Thinking ABC, utgitt av Nonjang, Seoul, South Korea
 2006: O wędrowaniu przy zasypianiu, utgitt av Hokus-Pokus, Warsaw
 2009: Kwak Young Kwon: Room in the Heart, BIUM, published by Agibooks, Seoul
 2010: Kim Hee-Kyung: The House of the Mind – MAUM, published by Changbi, Paju-si, South Korea
 2011: Blumkas Tagebuch - Vom Leben in Janusz Korczaks Waisenhaus, utgitt av Gimpel, Hannover
 2013: Eyes, published by Changbi, Paju-si

References

1960 births
Living people
20th-century Polish women artists
21st-century Polish women artists
People from Toruń
Polish children's writers
Polish children's book illustrators
Polish women children's writers
Nicolaus Copernicus University in Toruń alumni
Academic staff of Nicolaus Copernicus University in Toruń
Polish illustrators
Polish women illustrators